Max "Maxime" Hans Kuczyński (2 February 1890 – 26 November 1967) was a German physician of Jewish origin. He was the father of the former President of Peru, Pedro Pablo Kuczynski.

Biography
Maxime Kuczyński was born in Berlin, as the son of Emma (née Schlesinger) and Louis Kuczyński, both of Polish and Jewish origin.  He studied medicine and natural science at the University of Rostock. In 1913 he received his degree in philosophy, and in 1919 a degree in medicine.

During World War I, he served in the German army and participated in the Balkans Campaign. In 1924, he received his professorship. After the Nazis came to power he fled to Peru. Between 1924 and 1926 he conducted anthropological research in Central Asia, and later, between 1938 and 1948, in the Andes, and performed and published on self-experimentation in medicine in 1937.

Kuczyński died in Lima.

His son, Pedro Pablo Kuczynski, born in Lima in 1938, was Prime Minister between 2005 and 2006. A decade later, he became President after winning the second round in June 2016. His American granddaughter, Alex Kuczynski, is a journalist and writer.

References

1890 births
1967 deaths
Physicians from Berlin
20th-century Peruvian physicians
Academic staff of the Humboldt University of Berlin
Academic staff of the National University of San Marcos
German Army personnel of World War I
German people of Polish-Jewish descent
People from the Province of Brandenburg
Peruvian people of Polish-Jewish descent
German emigrants to Peru
Jewish emigrants from Nazi Germany
University of Rostock alumni
Kuczynski family